Lithuanian Football Federation's III league, LFF II lyga is the fourth tier Lithuanian football championship.

Members 

The league consists of leagues organized by County Football Federations in each of the 10 Counties of Lithuania. Due to low participant numbers some counties do not run III lyga competitions.

 Vilniaus Region Football Association
 Kaunas County Football Federation
 Šiauliai County Football Federation
 Klaipėda County Football Federation
 Panevėžys County Football Federation
 Alytus County Football Federation
 Utena County Football Federation
 Marijampolė County Football Federation
 Telšiai County Football Federation
 Tauragė County Football Federation

Current Season 
In 2019 only 6 federations organized III lyga competitions, two of them ran a combined league.

County Leagues

Vilnius Region 
Vilnius region league is by far the largest and most competitive. There were three more lower divisions competing in the region in 2019.

2019 season final standings:

Kaunas County 
Having had abundant teams in the county in the past, in 2019 Kaunas struggled to pull enough teams together to run a league. A solution was found to run a combined league with Marijampole County. 

2019 season final standings:

Klaipėda County 

2019 season final standings:

Šiauliai County 
There was good turnout in 2019 in Šiauliai County with 10 teams participating. The golden match was required to decide the league winner. 

2019 season final standings:

Alytus County
A bare minimum of 4 teams participated in 2019 season, allowing to extend Alytus County III league competition run for 10 years without a break. 

2019 season final standings:

Marijampolė County
Due to low participant numbers in 2019 it was decided to run a combined league with Kaunas County. The county ran III league competitions regularly with an exception of 2017. See Kaunas County

Panevėžys County 
For the second year in a row there were not sufficient team numbers to run a league in 2019. The county ran III league competitions regularly until then.

Utena County 
For the second year in a row there were not sufficient team numbers to run a league in 2019. The county ran III league competitions only twice in the last 6 years.

Tauragė County 
The last III lyga competition ran in Tauragė County was 2006.

Telšiai County 
Telšiai County, the country's smallest, has never run III league competition.

References

External links
 Kaunas football federation
 KLaipėda county championship
 Panevėžys county championship
 Šiauliai football federation
 Vilnius county championship

4